is a Japanese multinational corporation and conglomerate with a very wide range of products and services. It is one of the constituents of Nikkei 225 and is the world's largest musical instrument manufacturing company. The former motorcycle division was established in 1955 as Yamaha Motor Co., Ltd., which started as an affiliated company but later became independent, although Yamaha Corporation is still a major shareholder.

History 

Nippon Gakki Co. Ltd. (currently Yamaha Corporation) was established in 1887 as a reed organ manufacturer by Torakusu Yamaha (山葉寅楠) in Hamamatsu, Shizuoka Prefecture and was incorporated on 12 October 1897. In 1900, the company started the production of pianos. The first piano to be made in Japan was an upright built in 1900 by Torakusu Yamaha, founder of Nippon Gakki Co., Ltd. — later renamed Yamaha Corporation.  The company's origins as a musical instrument manufacturer are still reflected today in the group's logo—a trio of interlocking tuning forks.

After World War II, company president Genichi Kawakami repurposed the remains of the company's war-time production machinery and the company's expertise in metallurgical technologies to the manufacture of motorcycles. The YA-1 (AKA Akatombo, the "Red Dragonfly"), of which 125 were built in the first year of production (1954), was named in honour of the founder. It was a 125cc, single cylinder, two-stroke street bike patterned after the German DKW RT 125 (which the British munitions firm, BSA, had also copied in the post-war era and manufactured as the Bantam and Harley-Davidson as the Hummer). In 1955, the success of the YA-1 resulted in the founding of Yamaha Motor Co., Ltd., splitting the motorcycle division from the company. Also, in 1954 the Yamaha Music School was founded.

Yamaha has grown into the world's largest manufacturer of musical instruments (including pianos, "silent" pianos, drums, guitars, brass instruments, woodwinds, violins, violas, cellos, and vibraphones), and a leading manufacturer of semiconductors, audio/visual, computer related products, sporting goods, home appliances, specialty metals, and industrial robots. Yamaha released the Yamaha CS-80 in 1977.

In 1983, Yamaha made the first commercially successful digital synthesizer, the Yamaha DX7.

In 1988, Yamaha shipped the world's first CD recorder. Yamaha purchased Sequential Circuits in 1988. It bought a majority stake (51%) of competitor Korg in 1987, which was bought out by Korg in 1993.

In the late 1990s, Yamaha released a series of portable battery operated keyboards under the PSS and the PSR range of keyboards. The Yamaha PSS-14 and PSS-15 keyboards were upgrades to the Yamaha PSS-7 with short demo songs, short selectable phrases, and sound effects.

In 2002, Yamaha closed its archery product business that was started in 1959. Six archers in five different Olympic Games won gold medals using their products.

In January 2005, it acquired German audio software manufacturer Steinberg from Pinnacle Systems. In July 2007, Yamaha bought out the minority shareholding of the Kemble family in Yamaha-Kemble Music (UK) Ltd, Yamaha's UK import and musical instrument and professional audio equipment sales division. It was renamed Yamaha Music U.K. Ltd in late 2007. Kemble & Co. Ltd, the UK piano sales & manufacturing arm, was unaffected.

On 20 December 2007, Yamaha made an agreement with the Austrian Bank BAWAG P.S.K. Group BAWAG to purchase all the shares of Bösendorfer, intended to take place in early 2008. Yamaha intends to continue manufacturing at the Bösendorfer facilities in Austria. The acquisition of Bösendorfer was announced after the NAMM Show in Los Angeles, on January 28, 2008. As of 1 February 2008, Bösendorfer Klavierfabrik GmbH operates as a subsidiary of Yamaha Corp.

Yamaha Corporation is widely known for its music teaching programme that began in the 1950s. Yamaha electronics have proven to be successful, popular, and respected products. For example, the Yamaha YPG-625 was awarded "Keyboard of the Year" and "Product of the Year" in 2007 from The Music and Sound Retailer magazine. Other noteworthy Yamaha electronics include the SHS-10 Keytar, a consumer-priced keytar which offered MIDI output features normally found on much more expensive keyboards.

Other companies in the Yamaha Corporation group include:
 Bösendorfer Klavierfabrik GmbH, Vienna, Austria.
 Yamaha Fine Technologies Co., Ltd.
 Yamaha Music Communications Co., Ltd.
 Yamaha Pro Audio
 Steinberg
 Ampeg
 Line 6

Corporate mission
 is a Japanese word used by Yamaha Corporation to describe its corporate mission. Kandō is the sensation of profound excitement and gratification derived from experiencing supreme quality and performance. Some reasonable English equivalents are "emotionally touching" or "emotionally moving".

Yamaha Music Foundation 
The Yamaha Music Foundation is an organization established in 1966 by the authority of the Japanese Ministry of Education for the purpose of promoting music education and music popularization. It continued a program of music classes begun by Yamaha Corporation in 1954.

Products 

Yamaha expanded into many diverse businesses and product groups. The first venture into each major category is listed below.
 1887 Reed organs
1900 Pianos
 1903 Furniture
 1914 Harmonicas
 1922 Audio equipment (crank phonograph first)
 1942 Guitars
 1955 Motorcycles – made by Yamaha Motor Company, which started as an affiliated company of Nippon Gakki (Yamaha Corporation's name at the time) but is a separate company today
 1959 Sporting goods (starting with archery)
 1959 Music schools
 1961 Metal alloys
 1965 Band instruments (trumpet first)
 1967 Drums
 1971 Semiconductors
2000 Yamaha Music Communications (record company)
 2001 Yamaha Entertainment Group (record company)

Synthesizers and samplers

Yamaha announced the singing synthesizer Vocaloid for the first time at the German fair Musikmesse on March 5–9, 2003.

Yamaha began the sale and production of Vocaloid applications, starting with Lily which was later sold via Internet Co., Ltd.'s website. Their involvement continued with the VY series, with VY1 being the first, released in deluxe and standard editions on September 1, 2010. The VY series is a series designed to be a high quality product for professional musicians. The series is also designed with the intention to set a new standard for the Vocaloids for having no face, sex, or set voice, but are designed to complete any song. VY1 has a new approach to how the software handled the database of samples and improved the performance of the Vocaloid 2 engine.

Yamaha announced a version of the Vocaloid 2 software for the iPhone and iPad, which exhibited at the Y2 Autumn 2010 Digital Content Expo in Japan. Later, this version of the software was released using the VY1 voice. VY2 will also be released for this version of the software.

Factory locations
In Japan, the company maintains three factories for musical instrument manufacture, engine and various vehicle manufacture (motorcycles and marine products), with all factories located in Shizuoka Prefecture.

Kakegawa Factory
1480, Ryoke, Kakegawa-shi, Shizuoka
Toyooka Factory
203, Matsunokijima, Iwata-shi, Shizuoka
Tenryu Factory
283, Aoyacho, Minami-ku Hamamatsu-shi, Shizuoka

Sports teams
Yamaha Jubilo—Rugby
Júbilo Iwata—Football

See also
 List of phonograph manufacturers
 List of studio monitor manufacturers
 Yamaha Motor Company
 Yamaha Pro Audio
 mLAN
 Yamaha XG
 Yamaha Artist

References

External links

 
Japanese companies established in 1887
1940s initial public offerings
Brass instrument manufacturing companies
Clarinet manufacturing companies
Compact Disc player manufacturers
Companies based in Shizuoka Prefecture
Conglomerate companies established in 1887
Companies listed on the Tokyo Stock Exchange
Conglomerate companies of Japan
Electronic organ manufacturing companies
Fuyo Group
Guitar amplifier manufacturers
Guitar effects manufacturing companies
Guitar manufacturing companies
Headphones manufacturers
Japanese brands
Loudspeaker manufacturers
Microphone manufacturers
Multinational companies headquartered in Japan
Music equipment manufacturers
Musical instrument manufacturing companies of Japan
Percussion instrument manufacturing companies
Phonograph manufacturers
Piano manufacturing companies of Japan
Recorder makers
Robotics companies of Japan
Synthesizer manufacturing companies of Japan
Unmanned aerial vehicles of Japan
Unmanned aerial vehicle manufacturers
Vocaloid production companies
Hamamatsu